The Paleoloricata are valved polyplacophora without sutural laminae or insertion plates (as found in the neoloricata). The "order" probably represents a paraphyletic grouping.

References

Prehistoric chitons
Mollusc orders
Cambrian molluscs
Cambrian first appearances
Early Devonian extinctions